In Greek mythology, Acmon (Ancient Greek: Ἄκμων means 'anvil, pestle') was a Phrygian king who gave his name to the district known as Acmonia; he was the father of Mygdon, his successor.

Notes 

Kings of Phrygia

Reference 

 Graves, Robert, The Greek Myths, Harmondsworth, London, England, Penguin Books, 1960. 
 Graves, Robert, The Greek Myths: The Complete and Definitive Edition. Penguin Books Limited. 2017. 

Kings in Greek mythology